Dow Village may refer to:

 Dow Village, Couva, Trinidad and Tobago
 Dow Village, South Oropouche, Trinidad and Tobago

See also
 Dow, Kentucky, United States